A portfolio career comprises a variety of roles rather than one job at a single organisation. It can be a career that combines multiple paid and/or voluntary roles.
The philosopher and organisational behaviourist Charles Handy popularised the "portfolio" concept
in works like his 1994 book The Empty Raincoat.
Handy's recognition of the portfolio career-path came about when he realised that individuals would be required to develop portable skillsets to meet the needs of a fast-moving future workplace. His prediction foresaw what is now known as the gig economy.

Portfolio careers are often found in the creative industries where freelancing is the norm.
Economic conditions mean many are now actively choosing to pursue portfolio careers to make the most of their earning potential.

Advantages 

Advantages of a portfolio career include work–life balance, job security, flexibility, variety, multiple income streams and the ability to pursue individual interest areas.

Ben Legg, CEO of UK-based social enterprise The Portfolio Collective, said: "A portfolio career is much more resilient than having one permanent role. In addition to having multiple income sources, your work is always evolving, as old clients roll off and you win new ones."

Disadvantages 

Disadvantages are the lack of stability, traditional career progression, fluctuation of earnings and a lack of identity.

Herminia Ibarra, the Charles Handy Professor of Organisational Behaviour at London Business School, argues that the portfolio careerist is faced with the problem of identity. "There is no easy label, no shorthand. Inevitably, one resorts to explaining oneself with a laundry list, when the culturally appropriate answer is what the psychologist Kenneth Gergen called the progressive narrative: a story of hard work and linear ascent culminating in a recognisably top role."

Scale 
The Centre for Research on Self Employment, a London-based think tank, estimates that 250,000 UK workers who define their work as a portfolio career. A study by the Henley Business School determined that in the United Kingdom 25 per cent of workers had a side job. Ben Legg, CEO of UK-based social enterprise The Portfolio Collective, believes this number is likely to be in the millions by 2030.

Some 45 per cent of working Americans report having a side job, making them portfolio careerists. In the United Kingdom 60 per cent of students and graduates said they had a side job and 43 per cent needed the extra income to pay their rent.

Portfolio careers may become more common as the world economy and job market work to recover from the COVID-19 pandemic.

Issues 
Sean Smith, a retired vice-principal, argues that "a new economy that requires aspirational young people to effectively become captains of their own cottage industries will require schools to think very differently". He believes that schools will need to redefine how they view work readiness and change the expectations of young people as they prepare for work.

Tara Fenwick, Emeritus Professor of Professional Education in the School of Education at the University of Stirling, thinks "workers may need to educate clients about the nature of portfolio work; and employers who contract to portfolio workers must take more responsibility for negotiating fair contracts that are sensitive to overwork and unfair time pressures".

Nomenclature 
Young portfolio careerists are sometimes known as slashies or solopreneurs.

See also
 Part-time contract
 Side job
 Gig worker

References

Business
Labour economics
Work